Franklin is an upcoming biographical drama miniseries about the United States Founding Father Benjamin Franklin, based on Stacy Schiff's 2005 book A Great Improvisation: Franklin, France, and the Birth of America.

Premise
Depicts the eight years Benjamin Franklin spent in France to convince the country to underwrite America's democracy.

Cast
 Michael Douglas as Benjamin Franklin
 Noah Jupe as William Temple Franklin
 Ludivine Sagnier as Anne Louise Brillon de Jouy
 Thibault de Montalembert as Charles Gravier, comte de Vergennes
 Daniel Mays as Edward Bancroft
 Assaad Bouab as Pierre Beaumarchais
 Eddie Marsan as John Adams
 Jeanne Balibar as Anne-Catherine de Ligniville, Madame Helvétius
 Théodore Pellerin as Gilbert du Motier, Marquis de Lafayette
 John Hollingworth as Lord David Stormont

Production
It was announced in February 2022 that Michael Douglas would star in the series as Benjamin Franklin for Apple TV+, with Kirk Ellis writing the series and Tim Van Patten directing.

Filming began in June 2022 in Versailles, with Noah Jupe, Ludivine Sagnier, Daniel Mays, Assaad Bouab and Eddie Marsan amongst additional casting announced.

References

External links
Franklin at the Internet Movie Database

Apple TV+ original programming
Cultural depictions of Benjamin Franklin
Upcoming television series
American biographical series
Cultural depictions of John Adams
Cultural depictions of Gilbert du Motier, Marquis de Lafayette
Television series by ITV Studios